Ivor Jones (31 July 1899 – 24 November 1974) was a Welsh international footballer who played professionally as a winger.

Family
Jones came from a footballing family. His four brothers – Bryn, Shoni, Emlyn and Bert – were all professionals, as were his sons Bryn and Cliff and nephew Ken. His great-grandson Scott Neilson is also a professional footballer.

Club career
Jones played for Merthyr Town, Caerphilly, Swansea Town, West Bromwich Albion, Aberystwyth Town, Aldershot, Thames, Eastside and Aberavon Harlequins.

International career
Jones earned a total of 10 caps for Wales, scoring one goal.

References

1899 births
1974 deaths
Welsh footballers
Wales international footballers
English Football League players
Merthyr Town F.C. players
Swansea City A.F.C. players
West Bromwich Albion F.C. players
Aberystwyth Town F.C. players
Aldershot F.C. players
Thames A.F.C. players
Association football inside forwards